The Miss Perú 1991 pageant was held on April 26, 1991. That year, 24 candidates were competing for the national crown. The chosen winner represented Peru at the Miss Universe 1991. The rest of the finalists would enter in different pageants.

Placements

Special Awards

 Best Regional Costume - Lambayeque - Veronica Carranza
 Miss Photogenic - Piura - Leslie Stewart
 Miss Elegance - Apurímac - Marcela Flores
 Miss Body - Region Lima - Alithú Robinson
 Best Hair -  Amazonas - Carla Barzotti
 Miss Congeniality - Cajamarca - Rosa María Aschiero
 Most Beautiful Face - Piura - Leslie Stewart Vega

.

Delegates

Amazonas - Carla Barzotti 
Áncash - Carmita Andreu Ríos
Apurímac - Marcela Flores
Arequipa - María Elena Bellido
Ayacucho - Joanna Castro de la Matta Pinzás
Cajamarca - Rosa María Aschiero Perea
Callao - Eliana Martínez Márquez
Cuzco - Claudia Figueroa Moy
Huancavelica - Karen Lucich Larrauri
Ica - Lily Eyzaguirre
Junín - Blanca Salazar
La Punta - Mónica Cánepa

Lambayeque - Veronica Carranza Villarán
Madre de Dios - Elizabeth Gadea
Moquegua - Zulma Vázquez Bellot
Oxapampa - Elba Gálvez
Pasco - Giorgina Soto Gonzalez
Piura - Leslie Stewart
Puno - Milagritos Muñiz García
Region Lima - Alithu Robinson
Tacna - Verónica del Valle
Tumbes - Nancy Lama
Ucayali - Janeth Sacco
USA Peru - Frida Ximena Rivera-Schreiber

References 

Miss Peru
1991 in Peru
1991 beauty pageants